Games of the Heart is a Canadian drama film, directed by Céline Baril and released in 2001.

Credits
  Directed by: Céline Baril
  Written by: Céline Baril
  Produced by: Serge Noël and Céline Baril
  Cinematography by: Carlos Ferrand
  Film Editing: Natalie Lamoureaux
  Music by: Jérôme Minière
  Sound Design by: Dominik Pagacz
  Sound Editing by: Dominik Pagacz

Awards and nominations

Awards
 2002: Rhode Island International Film Festival  Best Foreign Film (Céline Baril)

Nominations
 2002: Jutra Awards Best Cinematography (Carlos Ferrand)

References

External links

2001 films
Canadian drama films
Quebec films
2000s French-language films
French-language Canadian films
2000s Canadian films